Northern Peninsula Airport  is an airport serving Bamaga, a town near the northern tip of the Cape York Peninsula and is located  southeast of Injinoo in Queensland, Australia. The airport is operated by the Northern Peninsula Area Regional Council. It was known as Bamaga Airport or Bamaga/Injinoo Airport and had the ICAO code YBAM.

Facilities

History
Built in late 1942 and known as Jacky Jacky Field, the airfield was renamed Higgins Field in 1943 in honour of Flight Lieutenant Brian Hartley Higgins. Operated as a dispersal field for Horn Island.

Royal Australian Air Force units based at Higgins Field during World War II included:
 No. 1 Repair and Salvage Unit RAAF
 No. 5 Repair and Salvage Unit RAAF
 No. 7 Squadron RAAF
 No. 23 Squadron RAAF
 No. 33 Operational Base Unit RAAF
 No. 34 Squadron RAAF
 No. 52 Radar Station RAAF was at nearby Mutee Head
 105th Light Field Ambulance

Airlines and destinations

See also
 List of airports in Queensland

References

External links
 History of Bamaga Airfield at PacificWrecks.com
 

Airports in Queensland